Yuriy Slabyshev is a Ukrainian retired footballer.

Career
In 1996 he started his football career in the local Zaporozhye Torpedo, from where he was loaned to Torpedo Zaporizhzhia in 1998. In the summer of 1999 he was invited to the Dnipro Dnipropetrovsk, where on 27 September 2001, he scored against Fiorentina in Europa League at the Stadio Artemio Franchi in the season 2001–02 In the second half of 2002, he defended the colors of Kryvbas Kryvyi Rih. From July 2003, he performed on loan in Borysfen Boryspol, from where he was loaned to the farms of the Borysfen Boryspil club. In July 2005 he joined Podillya Khmelnytskyi, but after two months he moved to Spartak Ivano-Frankivsk. From July 2007 he performed in Enerhetyk Bursztyn. In January 2008 he moved to Desna Chernihiv, the main club in the city of Chernihiv and in the second half in Komunalnyk Luhansk.In August 2009, he signed a contract with Sumy, where he played for 4 months. In 2010 he moved to Avangard Kramatorsk. In July 2012 he joined Kremin Kremenchuk.

Honours
Avangard Kramatorsk
 Ukrainian Second League: 2011–12

Dnipro Dnipropetrovsk
 Ukrainian Second League: 1999–2000

References

External links 
 Yuriy Slabyshev footballfacts.ru
 Yuriy Slabyshev allplayers.in.ua
 Yuriy Slabyshev soccerway.com

1979 births
Living people
FC Desna Chernihiv players
Ukrainian footballers
Ukrainian Premier League players
Ukrainian First League players
Ukrainian Second League players
Association football forwards